STAC-9 is an experimental drug that was developed by GlaxoSmithKline as a small-molecule activator of the sirtuin subtype SIRT1, with potential applications in the treatment of diabetes.

See also 
 SRT-1460
 SRT-1720
 SRT-2104
 SRT-2183
 SRT-3025

References 

Trifluoromethyl compounds
4-Pyridyl compounds
Amides